Gino Leurini (20 November 1934 – 12 August 2014) was an Italian film, stage and television actor.

Life and career 
Born  in Rome, Leurini made his film debut in 1947, in the Luigi Capuano's drama film Legge di sangue. One year later, he got the role of Garrone in Vittorio De Sica and Duilio Coletti's Heart and Soul.  Following the critical and commercial success of Léonide Moguy's Tomorrow Is Too Late, in which Leurini played the major role of the young student Franco, in the 1950s he started a brief season of major roles in adventure and melodrama films.

Filmography

References

External links 

1933 births
2014 deaths
Italian male film actors
Italian male child actors
Male actors from Rome
20th-century Italian male actors